Herpetopoma norfolkense is a species of sea snail, a marine gastropod mollusk in the family Chilodontaidae.

References

norfolkense
Gastropods described in 1994